This is a list of episodes of the television series Julia.

Series overview

Episodes

Season 1 (1968–69)

Season 2 (1969–70)

Season 3 (1970–71)

External links 
 

Julia